Joe Lisi (born September 9, 1950), also credited as Joe Lissi, is an American television actor. He appeared in the NBC television show Third Watch as NYPD Lieutenant Swersky from 2000 to 2005. He also appeared on the NBC television show Law & Order: Special Victims Unit as Craig Lennon, a parole officer and briefly appeared in the 1995 comedy/crime film The Jerky Boys: The Movie as a construction worker.

Life and career
Lisi was born and raised in New York City, New York. His father was Sicilian (from Giarre, Sicily) and his mother was of Irish descent. He spent 24 years in the New York Police Department (NYPD), retiring with the rank of captain. While already employed by the police department (1969), Joe Lisi enlisted in the United States Marine Corps Reserve. He was honorably discharged as a corporal.

Lisi took his first acting lesson at age 29 and made his Broadway debut (Take Me Out, 2003 Tony Winner, Best Play) at age 52. He studied theatre at HB Studio in New York City.

He is best known for his television roles as Dick Barone in The Sopranos and as Lt. Swersky on Third Watch.

Selected filmography
 Out of the Darkness (1985) as Patrolman
 Forever Lulu (1987) as Cop
 Family Business (1989) as Desk Sergeant
 True Blue (1989-1990) as Captain Motta
 Come See the Paradise (1990) as Detective
 Criminal Justice (1990) as Detective Lane
 Traces of Red (1992) as Lieutenant J.C. Hooks
 Who's the Man? (1993) as Captain Reilly
 Quiz Show (1994) as Reporter 
 Safe Passage (1994) as Dog Owner
 The Jerky Boys: The Movie (1995) as Construction Foreman
 Kiss of Death (1995) as Agent At Bungalow
 Trees Lounge (1996) as Harry
 Marvin's Room (1996) as Bruno
 His and Hers (1997) as Captain Barillo
 Happiness (1998) as Police Detective
 New York Undercover (1998) as Chief of Detectives
 The Adventures of Sebastian Cole (1998) as Concrete Guy
 Summer of Sam (1999) as Tony 'Olives'
 For Love of the Game (1999) as Pete
 The Sopranos (1999-2000) as Dick Barone
 Third Watch (1999-2005) as NYPD Lieutenant Robert "Bob" Swersky
 The Yards (2000) as Elliott Gorwitz
 15 Minutes (2001) as Police Captain
 Ash Wednesday (2002) as Charlie, The Wiseguy
 ER (2002) as NYPD Lieutenant Bob Swersky
 Taxi (2004) - Mr. Anthony Scalia
 Law & Order: Special Victims Unit (2005-2009) as Parole Officer Craig Lennon
 Synecdoche, New York (2008) as Maurice
 The Sorcerer's Apprentice (2010) as Police Captain
 Man on a Ledge (2012) as Desk Sergeant

References

External links

1950 births
Living people
American people of Irish descent
American people of Italian descent
United States Marines
United States Marine Corps reservists